Librazhd is a town and a municipality in Elbasan County, eastern Albania. The municipality was formed at the 2015 local government reform by the merger of the former municipalities Hotolisht, Librazhd, Lunik, Orenjë, Polis, Qendër Librazhd and Stëblevë, that became municipal units. The seat of the municipality is the town Librazhd. The population of the former municipality at the 2011 census was 6,937. Librazhd is the nearest town to the Shebenik-Jabllanice National Park.

History 

Librazhd (Liburazhda) is attested in the Ottoman defter of 1467 as a village belonging to the timar of Karagöz in the vilayet of Çermeniça. The settlement had a total of 33 households, represented by the following household heads: Ilia Berishi, Pop Mihali, Gjergj Vaskuqi, Ivo Stajo, Nikolla Todini, Miho Gjirgashi, Todor Sqavi, Mihal Arassi (Arrasi), Gjurko Papa Sedani (possibly, Papasdani), Gjergj Arassi, Gjergj Gjonjo (possibly, Gjonevi), Miladin Simko, Dimitri Gjinko, Todor Kalini, Petër Simko, Ivo Nikoto, Pop Nikolla, Todorec Nikoto, Stan Mali, Dimitri Kozmo, Petko Stajko, Stajo son of Semini, Gjin Franku, Bogdo Kalini, Frank Radoslani, Gjon Prokopi, Petër Rado, Gjon Birko, Simo Birko, Stan Kaliqi, Pejko Stajo, Miho Makini (possibly, Magjini), Gjergj Budisha, Manec Berishi, Dimitri Kostovi, Gjoni son of Rado, Dimitri son of Miho, Dimitri son of Aleko, and Nenada son of Niko.

Librazhd was one of the youngest cities in Albania and was proclaimed on the 18th of February 1960. Librazhd is also famous for being connected to the Via Egnatia road that stretched from Istanbul all the way on to Durrës. The people of Librazhd also participated in the Albanian Declaration of Independence in the 28 of November 1912. World War II two battalions of the National Liberation Movement ambushed defeated Nazi Germany troops near Librazhd killing over 200 German soldiers.

Historical Places
Via Egnatia
WWII Memorial

Points of Interest
Shebenik-Jabllanice National Park
Shkumbin
World War II Memorial

Transportation

Bus
There are buses in Librazhd that can take you in other cities in Albania and other countries.

Trains
There is no train line that can goes to or from Librazhd.
Elbasan-Pogradec extension has been closed

Highways
The only main road in Librazhd is the SH3 (State Road 3) that starts in Tirana and ends in Korçë and passes by Librazhd.

Sports
Librazhd favourite city sport is football. Its main soccer team is Sopoti Librazhd founded 1948. Its home stadium is Sopoti Stadium created in 1964 with a capacity of 3,000 spectators. The team is now in the Albanian Second Division group A. The team has had some problems with the stadium being outdated during the 2017-18 Albanian Second Division. Now it is a renovated stadium.

Notable residents

Taulant Balla (born 1977), politician

See also
 Shebenik-Jabllanice National Park

References

External links

 Municipality of Librazhd Official Website
 Librazhd tourist guide

 
Municipalities in Elbasan County
Administrative units of Librazhd
Towns in Albania